A Common Land Unit (CLU) is the smallest unit of land that has a permanent, contiguous boundary, a common land cover and land management, a common owner and a common producer in agricultural land associated with USDA farm programs. CLU boundaries are delineated from relatively permanent features such as fence lines, roads, and/or waterways.

See also
 National Agriculture Imagery Program

References

United States Department of Agriculture